Thomas Alexander Fraser, 12th Lord Lovat and 1st Baron Lovat, KT (17 June 1802 – 28 June 1875) was a Scottish nobleman. He was  the 21st Chief MacShimidh of the Clan Fraser of Lovat, succeeding the notorious Jacobite Simon Fraser, 11th Lord Lovat.

Early life
Born on 17 June 1802, he was the son of Amelia (née Leslie) Fraser and Alexander Fraser, 9th of Strichen, a Captain of the 1st Dragoon Guards who died on 28 October 1803, shortly after his birth. His paternal grandparents were Alexander Fraser, 8th of Strichen and Jean (née Menzies) Fraser (a daughter of William Menzies and niece of James Menzies of Culdares). His maternal grandparents were John Leslie, 22nd Baron of Balquhain and the former Violet Dalzell.

In 1821, Fraser commissioned Aberdeen architect John Smith to design a country house known as Strichen House.

Career
In 1815, upon the death of Archibald Campbell Fraser (who outlived all of his children), Fraser became the 21st Chief of the Clan Fraser, through his descent from the second son of the 4th Lord Lovat. He also inherited the Lovat estates at Beauly in Inverness-shire. On 28 January 1837 he was created Baron Lovat, of Lovat in the County of Inverness, in the Peerage of the United Kingdom. In 1854, the attainder of the 11th Lord Lovat (who had been attainted and executed in 1747) was reversed, and Lovat thereby became 12th Lord Lovat in the Peerage of Scotland. He notably served as Lord Lieutenant of Inverness from 1853 to 1873 and was made a Knight of the Thistle in 1865.

Personal life

On 6 August 1823, Fraser was married to Charlotte Georgina Stafford-Jerningham (1800–1876), the daughter of George William Stafford-Jerningham, 8th Baron Stafford, in 1823. The couple had three daughters and four sons, including:

 Amelia Charlotte Fraser (1824–1912), who married Charles Scott-Murray of Danesfield, a Conservative MP for Buckinghamshire.
 Frances Giorgiana Fraser (1826–1899), who married Sir Pyers Mostyn, 8th Baronet (1811–1882).
 Charlotte Henrietta Fraser (1827–1904), who married Sir Matthew Sausse, the Chief Justice of Bombay, in 1866.
 Simon Fraser, 13th Lord Lovat (1828–1887), who married Alice Mary Weld-Blundell, daughter of Thomas Weld-Blundell.
 Alexander Edward Fraser (1831–1885), a Lt.-Col. in the Scots Guards who fought in the Crimean War and married Georgiana Mary Heneage, only daughter of George Fieschi Heneage of Hainton Hall.
 George Edward Stafford Fraser (1834–1854), who died unmarried.
 Henry Thomas Fraser (1838–1904), a Colonel in the 1st Battalion Scots Guards who died unmarried.

Lord Lovat died in June 1875, aged 73, and was succeeded in his titles by his eldest son Simon. Lady Lovat died in 1876.

Legacy
Lord Lovat's legacy is that of the present 16th Lord Lovat, and the good standing of the present Clan Fraser. He completed the restoration of Lovat titles and lands, which had been started by the 11th Lord's son, General Simon Fraser of Lovat.

References

External links

1802 births
1875 deaths
Clan Fraser
Knights of the Thistle
Lord-Lieutenants of Inverness-shire
Fraser, Thomas Fraser, 4th Lord
Lords Lovat
Peers of the United Kingdom created by William IV